hy*drau"lx, alternatively spelled HYDRAULX and Hydraulx, is a visual effects (VFX) company based in  Santa Monica, California.

History
Hydraulx was founded in 2002 by Greg and Colin Strause, directors of Aliens vs. Predator: Requiem. In 2005, the studio completed over 700 visual effects shots for feature films. The company is based in  Santa Monica, California.

In 2010, the company produced their own feature film, Skyline, which was also directed by the Strause brothers. That film would result in a lawsuit against the brothers by Sony Pictures Entertainment. The suit alleged that the brothers diverted resources meant for their work on Battle: Los Angeles to Skyline. Shortly after the release of Battle, Sony dropped their lawsuit, claiming they were satisfied that none of the brothers' work on that film ended up in Skyline.

Hydraulx was one of thirteen companies that worked on the 2011 film Captain America: The First Avenger.

In 2012 the company did effects work on The Avengers.

Filmography

Films

TV series

Music videos
Usher "Love In This Club"
Usher "Moving Mountains"
Tool "Schism", "Parabol/Parabola" and "Vicarious"
A Perfect Circle "Weak and Powerless" and "Passive"
Korn "Freak on a Leash"
Snoop Dogg "Drop it Like it's Hot"
U2 "Elevation"
Linkin Park "Crawling"
Will Smith "Black Suit's Comin"
Powerman 5000 "Bombshell"
Britney Spears "Stronger"
Godsmack "I Stand Alone"
Jennifer Lopez "Play"
Aerosmith "Jaded"
P.O.D. "Alive"
Shakira "Wherever Wherever"
Jet "Are You Gonna Be My Girl"
Papa Roach "Between Angels and Insects"
Disturbed "Prayer"
Taproot "Poem"

Commercials
Scion "tC"
Scion "xA"
Scion "xB"
Mercury Mariner "Hybrid", "Soundwave", "Attraction"
Lincoln "Landmarks"
Gatorade "Winning Formula"
Ford F150 "Kiln"
Jeep Grand Cherokee "Reflection"
Coca-Cola/World of WarCraft "WOW Be Yourself"
United States Marine Corps "Diamond"
Fresca "Dance"
Nike Stickman campaign: "Hoops", "Frisbee", "Football" and "Pool"
PlayStation 2's God of War "Gods" and "Monsters"
Toyota Matrix "Sunglasses"
Toyota Corolla "Imagination"
Universal Studios "Creep" and "Scare"
Norfolk Southern "Trees"

References

External links
Official website of Hydraulx
Official website of the Brothers Strause
Official website of Hydraulx Filmz

Visual effects companies
Entertainment companies established in 2002
Companies based in Los Angeles County, California
2002 establishments in California